Dioxyna thomae is a species of tephritid or fruit flies in the genus Dioxyna of the family Tephritidae.

Distribution
Virgin Islands.

References

Tephritinae
Insects described in 1928
Diptera of North America
Taxa named by Charles Howard Curran